Human chess, living chess or live chess is a form of chess in which people take the place of pieces. Human chess is typically played outdoors, either on a large chessboard or on the ground, and is often played at Renaissance fairs.

Forms 
Many human chess games are choreographed stage shows performed by actors trained in stage combat. When this is the case, piece captures are represented by choreographed fights that determine whether the piece is actually taken or not. Alternatively, the pieces may spar, following rules similar to those used by the Society for Creative Anachronism.

Instances 
A costumed human chess game has been staged every two years on the second week in September in the Italian city of Marostica, near Venice, since 1923. The game commemorates a legendary chess game played in 1454 by two young knights in order to settle which of them would court the lady that both had fallen in love with. The event lasts 3 days. The participants of the game dress in historic clothes. The human chess game has strict rules which have been set by a specific committee. The performance lasts 30 minutes.

In terms of the Japanese game of shogi, an annual festival in Tendō, Yamagata held every late April has an event called , where people involved alongside large shogi pieces with stands are dressed in Sengoku period costumes. Tendō and Marostica have been sister cities since 1993.

In xiangqi, human chess is a tradition in Vietnam, where it is called cờ người, and is a feature at many Vietnamese village and temple festivals.

Fictional representations 

Human chess is a theme in Lewis Carroll's Through the Looking-Glass (1871).

The Chessmen of Mars depicts a version of a Martian chess variant called Jetan where the pieces are human captives and captures in the game are replaced by fights to the death between them.

Land of the Giants 2/4 "Deadly Pawn" an insane Chessmaster uses the little People as live chess pieces-who if they cant escape are either going to be turned over to the SIDE or killed!

Harry Potter and the Philosopher's Stone features a game of Wizard's chess with magically animated human-sized pieces. The characters Harry, Ron, and Hermione take the place of three of the pieces.

Hunters featured a game of human chess played at a concentration camp during WWII. This was criticized by the Auschwitz Museum since such a game never actually took place.

Episode "Checkmate" of The Prisoner features the protagonist in such a chess match.

The part "Chess" of Tales of the Unusual features a human chess game that the main protagonist is forced to play. Eliminated human chess pieces seems to be killed, but revealed in the end that all kills and all deaths are faked.

References

External links 

Life-sized chess games in urban settings
AnimeBoston.com Cosplay Human Chess game
Photos of Anime Boston 2007 cosplay chess
Animeiowa 2008–2009 anime-themed human cosplay chess
AnimeNEXT's Cosplay Human Chess
 

Chess variants
Competition